Bellechasse—Les Etchemins—Lévis (formerly Lévis—Bellechasse) is a federal electoral district in Quebec, Canada, that has been represented in the House of Commons of Canada since 2004. It was created in 2003 from Lévis-et-Chutes-de-la-Chaudière and Bellechasse—Etchemins—Montmagny—L'Islet ridings.

Geography

The riding is located south of Quebec City and covers a strip of land between the city's cross-river suburbs and the Canada–US border. It is located in the Quebec region of Chaudière-Appalaches. It consists of the RCM of Bellechasse and most of Les Etchemins, as well as the eastern part of the city of Lévis.

The neighbouring ridings are Beauce, Lotbinière—Chutes-de-la-Chaudière, Louis-Hébert, Québec, Beauport—Limoilou, Montmorency—Charlevoix—Haute-Côte-Nord, and Montmagny—L'Islet—Kamouraska—Rivière-du-Loup.

The 2012 federal electoral distribution has concluded this riding will retain its current boundaries, but was renamed Bellechasse—Les Etchemins—Lévis.

Profile 
The rural regions to the east of the riding are extremely strong areas for the Conservatives. The city of Lévis, however, is more of a battleground region. In the 2011 election, the Tories had to contend with a strong NDP performance in that city. The NDP's support was more concentrated to the west of the Boulevard de la Rive-Sud, closer to the river front.

Members of Parliament

This riding has elected the following Members of Parliament:

Election results

Bellechasse—Les Etchemins—Lévis, 2013 Representation Order

This renamed riding maintained its boundaries for the 42nd Canadian federal election:

Lévis—Bellechasse, 2003 Representation Order

See also
 List of Canadian federal electoral districts
 Past Canadian electoral districts

References

Campaign expense data from Elections Canada
2011 Results from Elections Canada
Riding history

Notes

Politics of Lévis, Quebec
Quebec federal electoral districts
Quebec City Area